The 2022–23 Iona Gaels men's basketball team represented Iona University in the 2022–23 NCAA Division I men's basketball season. The Gaels, led by third-year head coach Rick Pitino, played their home games at the Hynes Athletic Center in New Rochelle, New York as members of the Metro Atlantic Athletic Conference. They finished the season 24–7, 17–3 in MAAC play to finish in first place. As the No. 1 seed in the MAAC tournament, they defeated Mount St. Mary's and Niagara to advance to the tournament championship game. They defeated Marist to win the tournament championship and earned the conference's automatic bid to the NCAA tournament. They received a No. 13 seed in the West region, and lost in the first round to No. 4 seed UConn 63–87.

Previous season
The Gaels finished the 2021–22 season 25–8, 17–3 in MAAC play to finish as MAAC regular season champions. As the top seed in the MAAC tournament, they were upset in the quarterfinals by #9 seed Rider. As a conference regular season champion who failed to win their conference tournament, they received an automatic bid to the NIT, where they lost in the first round to Florida.

Roster

Schedule and results

|-
!colspan=12 style=| Regular season

|-
!colspan=12 style=| MAAC tournament

|-
!colspan=12 style=}| NCAA tournament

Sources

References

Iona Gaels men's basketball seasons
Iona Gaels
Iona Gaels men's basketball
Iona Gaels men's basketball
Iona